Pygoda is a New World genus of stink bugs in the family Pentatomidae. It was formerly considered a subgenus of Edessa but was elevated to genus based on morphological traits: species grouped under Pygoda share a distinctive set of features from body, male external genitalia, and male and female internal genitalia that are very different from any other subgenus of Edessa.

Species
The following species belong to the genus Pygoda: 
 Pygoda amianta Fernandes, Nascimento & Nunes, 2018
 Pygoda civilis (Breddin, 1903)
 Pygoda expolita (Distant, 1892)
 Pygoda irrorata (Dallas, 1851)
 Pygoda poecila Fernandes, Nascimento & Nunes, 2018
 Pygoda polita (Lepeletier & Serville, 1825)
 Pygoda ramosa Fernandes, Nascimento & Nunes, 2018
 Pygoda thoracica (Dallas, 1851)
 Pygoda variegata Fernandes, Nascimento & Nunes, 2018

References

 

Pentatomidae
Pentatomomorpha genera